Buin Zahra County is in Qazvin province, Iran. The capital of the county is the city of Buin Zahra. At the 2006 census, the county's population was 153,873 in 38,377 households. The following census in 2011 counted 164,723 people in 47,029 households. At the 2016 census, the county's population was 122,994 in 36,814 households, by which time Abgarm and Ava Districts had been separated from the county to form Avaj County.

Administrative divisions

The population history and structural changes of Buin Zahra County's administrative divisions over three consecutive censuses are shown in the following table. The latest census shows four districts, nine rural districts, and five cities.

Demographics
The majority of the population of this county is Azerbaijani Turks,

 

 but a minority of Tat people with a population of about 30,000 also live in the cities of Shal, Dansesfahan and Sagzabad.

In popular culture 
Jalal Al-e-Ahmad's monograph: "Tat people of Block-e-Zahra" provides detailed description of the region.

The Buin-Zahra is famous for pistachio and boasts many pistachio gardens. The main street in capital(Buin-Zahra) is Vali Asr St.

Azad University of Buin-Zahra is also located in this city about ten minutes from City Center.

One of the tourist attraction in this area is "Mehregan Town" which is located in north of Buin-Zahra, 14 minutes from Buin-Zahra Square.

Earthquakes
The area was devastated by the 1962 Bou'in-Zahra earthquake and again by the 2002 Bou'in-Zahra earthquake.

References

 

Counties of Qazvin Province